Open Mind Productions is a British television production company founded on 1 June 1989 by Roland Tongue and Chris Ellis. Tongue, who retired from the company at the end of 2011, was previously a film editor at the BBC, while Ellis was previously a teacher and script writer at Children's BBC.

The company has produced programmes for children and educational TV, including The Word Machine, The Number Crew, Rat-A-Tat-Tat and Maths Mansion for Channel 4 and Numberjacks and The Shiny Show for the BBC.

References

Television production companies of the United Kingdom
Mass media companies established in 1989